Ahmed Musah is a Ghanaian politician and a member of the Second Parliament of the Fourth Republic representing the Asokwa East constituency in the Ashanti Region of Ghana.

Early life and education 
Musah was born in Asokwa East in the Ashanti Region of Ghana.

Politics 
Musah was elected into Parliament on the Ticket of the National Democratic Congress during the December 2000 Ghanaian General Elections for the Asokwa East Constituency in the Ashanti Region of Ghana. He defeated Othman Baba Yahya, a National Congress Party member by 30,382 votes out of the 84,111 valid votes cast representing 26.70%. He was defeated by Dr. Edward Baffoe Bonne a New Patriotic Party member who polled 45,482 out of the 78,029 valid votes cast representing 58.30%. He served for only one term as a parliamentarian.

Career 
Musah is a Ghanaian politician who served as the Member of Parliament for the Asokwa East Constituency in the Ashanti Region of Ghana from 1997 to 2001.

References 

Living people
National Democratic Congress (Ghana) politicians
Ghanaian MPs 1997–2001
People from Ashanti Region
Year of birth missing (living people)